Big Joanie is a British punk trio formed in London in 2013. Its members are Stephanie Phillips (guitar and vocals), Estella Adeyeri (bass guitar and vocals), and Chardine Taylor-Stone (drums and vocals). After a few singles and EPs they released their first album in 2018 with Thurston Moore and Eva Prinz's Daydream Library Series, and have since signed to Kill Rock Stars in the U.S.

History

Formation and early releases 
Big Joanie was formed by Stephanie Phillips in 2013, who posted online asking for bandmates with whom to start a black feminist punk band after becoming frustrated with the lack of intersectionality in the scene. Chardine Taylor-Stone, who Phillips had met through Imkaan, and the band's original bassist Kiera Coward-Deyell responded. They played their first set at the inaugural First Timers, an event where all the bands had to be new, most of the members had to be playing a new instrument and they had to include someone from a marginalised group.

The name of the band is partly a tribute to Phillips’ mother, Joan, and partly based on a Caribbean figure of speech. ‘When we say a child is “acting big”, they’re acting bigger than themselves. I just thought that would be a great phrase for a strong, confident woman.’

In 2014 the band released their first EP Sistah Punk on Tuff Enuff Records, and in 2016 they self released a 7" three song single entitled Crooked Room on their own Sistah Punk Records. The title track is inspired by a lecture by the writer Melissa Harris-Perry, who compared life as a black woman in a white patriarchy to trying to find a true vertical in a room where everything is crooked. Another song on the release is a punk cover of No Scrubs by TLC.

Line-up change and Decolonise Fest

Estella Adeyeri (also of Witching Waves and Charmpit) joined in 2017 to replace Coward-Deyell after she moved to Scotland. Later that year the band supported American bands Sad13 and Downtown Boys on UK tours. In early 2018 they recorded their debut album with producer Margo Broom at Hermitage Works Studios.

Over the weekend of 2–4 June 2017, DIY Diaspora Punx (a collective started by Phillips and also containing other London musicians such as Rachel Aggs) put on the first Decolonise Fest at DIY Space For London. Decolonise Fest is the UK's first music festival created by and for people of colour. The second edition of the festival, again mostly held at DIY Space, occurred from 22 to 24 June 2018. The festival was held for a third time over 29 to 30 June 2019, at which Big Joanie performed.

Release of debut album

On 5 September 2018 Big Joanie announced their debut album Sistahs would be released in late November the same year with a music video for lead single "Fall Asleep". It is the first album to be released by Ecstatic Peace Library, a publishing company ran by visual book editor Eva Prinz and musician Thurston Moore, in their Daydream Library Series. 

Sistahs was released on 30 November to positive reviews, including in The Guardian, Rolling Stone, and The Quietus.

In November 2018 they supported American band Parquet Courts on a UK and European tour.  They played their first American shows in March 2019 at South by Southwest, debuting via BBC Music Introducing, and were announced in April as Bikini Kill's main support for their two European shows of the year at Brixton Academy in June.

On 26 February 2020, Big Joanie supported Sleater-Kinney alongside Harkin at the Brixton Academy. Phillips cites Sleater-Kinney as having "really influenced the way I thought about writing emotional songs, and my approach to punk music".

On 14 August of that year the band released a 7" single of their cover of Solange's Cranes in the Sky with a live recording of It's You from their first album on the flip. On 2 October it was announced that Big Joanie had signed in the U.S. to Portland OR based independent record label Kill Rock Stars ahead of their second album. Their first release for the label was a split with Adeyeri's other band Charmpit, which was released on 27 November of that year.

Back Home

On 1 June 2022 Big Joanie released the single Happier Still, it was written after the release of the debut album and finished whilst they were in Austin for SXSW 2019. On July 27, 2022, Pitchfork revealed that their sophomore album, titled Back Home, was to be released on November 4 of the same year. The album received positive reviews that mention its "expansive" sound and "breadth of style".

Musical style
On OkayAfrica, the trio were noted as one of 20 Black Punk Bands You Need To Listen To. They were also called a riot grrrl band.

Discography

Albums
Sistahs – Daydream Library Series, LP, MP3 (2018)
Back Home - Kill Rock Stars / Daydream Library Series, LP, CD, MP3 (2022)

EPs
Sistah Punk – Tuff Enuff Records, Cassette, MP3 (2014)
Crooked Room – Sistah Punk Records, 7", MP3 (2016)

Singles
Cranes in the Sky / It's You – Third Man Records, 7" (2020)
Kluster Rooms Sessions (Split with Charmpit) - Kill Rock Stars, 7" (2020)
Happier Still - Kill Rock Stars / Daydream Library Series, MP3 (2022)

Further reading
Gal Dem interview, 2016

References

External links
 
 Big Joanie on Bandcamp

All-female punk bands
Underground punk scene in the United Kingdom
Musical groups established in 2013
Musical groups from London
British musical trios
Black British musical groups
2013 establishments in England
Riot grrrl bands